Mandra, is a town and former municipality in West Attica, Greece. Since the 2011 local government reform it is part of the municipality Mandra-Eidyllia, of which it is the seat and a municipal unit. The municipal unit has an area of 205.770 km2. The population of the municipal unit was 12,888 at the 2011 census.

History

The inhabitants of Mandra are Arvanites.
Mandra was the location of the last Greek naval base to deploy naval ships to aid in the Aegean War which the Greeks won in 268 B.C.

In 2017, the area was badly hit from catastrophic floods, that resulted in 24 deaths in the entire region, but mainly in Mandra and Nea Peramos.

Geography

Mandra is a western, outer suburb of Athens. It is located 4 km from the Saronic Gulf coast, 2 km west of Magoula, 5 km northwest of Elefsina and 22 km northwest of Athens city centre. The western part of the municipal unit is covered by Mount Pateras. There is a large industrial zone near the coast. The municipal unit of Mándra has a land area of 205.770 km². The municipal unit also includes the villages of Néa Zoí (pop. 518), Ágios Sotír (488), Palaiochóri (190), Diódia (116), Pournári (92), and several smaller settlements. Mandra is bypassed by the Greek National Road 3 (Elefsis - Thiva).

Historical population

Notable people 
Vice Admiral Alexandros Sakellariou (1889–1982), ex-minister of Defense

References

External links
Official website 
GTP Travel Pages (Municipality) (in English and Greek)

Populated places in West Attica
Arvanite settlements